A Violent Life (also known as Cellini: A Violent Life) is a 1990 Italian biographical drama film directed by Giacomo Battiato. It depicts real life events of  goldsmith and sculptor Benvenuto Cellini.

Cast

Wadeck Stanczak as Benvenuto Cellini
Max von Sydow as Pope Clement VII
Ennio Fantastichini as Cosimo de' Medici
Pamela Villoresi as Fiore
Ben Kingsley as The Governor
Sophie Ward as Sulpizia 
Bernard-Pierre Donnadieu as Francis I of France 
Amanda Sandrelli as Pantasilea
Maurizio Donadoni as Rosso Fiorentino
Tony Vogel as Baccio
Lorenza Guerrieri as Faustina
Florence Thomassin as Madame d'Estampes

References

External links
 

1990 films
Italian biographical drama films
1990s Italian-language films
Films directed by Giacomo Battiato
Biographical films about artists
Cultural depictions of Benvenuto Cellini
Cultural depictions of Francis I of France
Cultural depictions of Pope Clement VII
1990s biographical drama films
Films set in the 16th century
1990 drama films
1990s Italian films